UUC may refer to:

 The Coleraine campus of the University of Ulster
 The Ulster Unionist Council, a forerunner of the Ulster Unionist Party
 A codon for phenylalanine
 The Unitarian Universalist Church
 An Unincorporated Urban Community
 User Uploaded Content